The Nantenbach Curve (German: Nantenbacher Kurve or Verbindungskurve Nantenbach) is the name of a connecting curve between the Main-Spessart Railway and the Hanover–Würzburg high-speed line. Coming from Aschaffenburg the line branches off towards Würzburg, about five kilometres northeast of Lohr, in the cadastral district of Nantenbach, in the community of Neuendorf. From the Main-Spessart line, the railway turns in a wide curve to the southeast to a junction at the Rohrbach operating station on the Hanover–Würzburg line.

Route
 
The route is 11.3 kilometres long with continuous double track, electrified, equipped  with the German train protection system,  Linienzugbeeinflussung and running on many engineering structures: the 694.5 metre long viaduct over the Main, followed by the 3,941 m long Schönrain Tunnel (passing under the 5,528m long Muhlberg Tunnel on the Hanover–Würzburg line) and another three tunnels. About 60 percent of the curve (6,449 m) is four tunnels with lengths between 526 and 3941 metres. The track rises 127 m from the Nantenbach junction at 156m above sea level to Rohrbach operating station  at  283 meters above sea level on a consistent grade of 1.25%. The minimum curve radius of 2,650 m allows a speed of 200 km/h. 740 m of the line is on bridges. The track is located for its full length in the Main-Spessart nature park. The track is built largely slab track on an asphalt base. 

The line is used by about 60 freight and passenger trains each day.

History 
Planning for the line started in 1975 and planning approval was given in 1988. Construction started in March 1990 and the line was put into operation in June 1994.

References

Railway lines in Bavaria
High-speed railway lines in Germany
Railway lines opened in 1994
1994 establishments in Germany
Main-Spessart